The 2018 Idaho State Bengals football team represented Idaho State University as a member of the Big Sky Conference during the 2018 NCAA Division I FCS football season. Led by second-year head coach Rob Phenicie, the Bengals compiled an overall record of 6–5 with a mark of 5–3 in conference play, tying for fourth place in the Big Sky. Idaho State played their home games at Holt Arena in Pocatello, Idaho.

Previous season
The Bengals finished the 2017 season 4–7, 2–6 in Big Sky play to finish in a three-way tie for ninth place.

Preseason

Polls
On July 16, 2018 during the Big Sky Kickoff in Spokane, Washington, the Bengals were predicted to finish in twelfth place in the coaches poll and tenth place in the media poll.

Preseason All-Conference Team
The Bengals had one player selected to the Preseason All-Conference Team.

James Madison – Sr. RB

Schedule

Game summaries

Western Colorado

at California

at North Dakota

Northern Arizona

Idaho

at UC Davis

at Liberty

Montana State

at Portland State

at Cal Poly

Weber State

Ranking movements

References

Idaho State
Idaho State Bengals football seasons
Idaho State Bengals football